Guang Ping Yang Tai Chi Chuan, which has become known as the "lost" Yang-style tai chi chuan form, combines all the positive aspects of Yang Style with qualities that added strength and versatility. Guang Ping's stances are lower and wider than Yang style but not as pronounced as Chen style and are also distinguished by as little as a 51%/49% weight difference between leading and trailing foot in certain moves. A stronger, more balanced foundation gives the student more power and greater flexibility.  Guang Ping Yang Tai Chi Chuan also combines Xingyiquan and Baguazhang energies, which can be seen in Guang Ping's spiral force energy and projecting force energy theories.

Kuo Lien Ying is credited with bringing Guang Ping Yang Tai Chi Ch’uan to the United States.

There appears to be controversy on whether this is a "notable and even distinct" style of t'ai chi ch'uan, and its adherents have battled this perception for many years. Thanks to the efforts of Grandmaster Henry Look, the first president of the Guang Ping Yang Ta'i Chi Association, Guang Ping Yang Tai Chi Chuan has been acknowledged and listed as a separate t'ai chi ch'uan category in many competitions and tournaments across the country, such as the Kuosho International Martial Arts Tournaments and the UC Berkeley Chinese Wushu Tournaments.

"Sifu always remembered and appreciated the purity of his teacher's (Wang Chiao-Yu) transmission. Grand Master Wang passed on the original, traditional form of Tai-Chi Chuan with exactly 64 movements. Sifu (Kuo) followed his teacher's example and made no changes. In this way the form has remained connected to its true roots in the traditional philosophy of China, as first embodied in the 64 hexagrams of the ancient Book of Changes."<ref>Tai-Chi Chuan in Theory and Practice, Page 28] </ref>

 64 Movements of T'ai chi ch'uan Guang Ping Yang Style 

 History of T'ai chi ch'uan 

Based on unsubstantiated legends, the fighting system of T'ai chi ch'uan was created by Zhang Sanfeng in approximately 1270 AD. Legend has it that Zhang Sanfeng was inspired by watching combat between a snake and a crane, observing the grace and flow of these creatures. When the snake would strike, the crane would gracefully retreat. When the crane attacked, the snake would recoil. In this contest the principles of yin and yang, where the soft overcomes the hard, became evident.

The forms and postures as they were originally performed are no longer seen today, but the 'operating principles' were codified in the writing of Zhang Sanfeng and are enacted today in modern forms.

The form of t'ai chi ch'uan is based on the ideas from Taoism, a philosophy or world view derived from the I Ching (Book of Changes) and from the writings of Laozi. The I Ching, which embodies the idea of yin and yang and their opposition, alternation and interaction, originated and was developed in the 2nd and 3rd centuries, BCE. Lao Tzu wrote the Tao Te Ching in the 5th century, BCE.  One of the most common images in this book is water, which is soft and yielding but which can overcome the hardest of substances. So, too, is t'ai chi ch'uan, seemingly soft and yielding, but holding the capacity for great power.

 T'ai chi ch'uan translates as "Supreme Ultimate Boxing" 

The Supreme Ultimate refers to the Tao (Dao), the framework within which Yin and Yang manifest in nature. Tao is the Path or the Way. Yin and Yang represent opposite aspects of the universe. One cannot exist without the other, one contains the seeds of the other, and each is opposite in relation to the other. Examples of Yin and Yang are day and night, light and dark, empty and full, masculine and feminine, receptive and active.

T'ai chi ch'uan therefore indicates that the art contains within itself (in the movements, shapes and patterns of breathing) all that is necessary for these dynamic forces to interact and be reconciled. The character Ch'uan refers to a school or method of boxing or combat. T'ai chi ch'uan, as it was originally conceived, is a sophisticated method of self-defense based on the reconciliation of dynamically interacting forces. The T'ai chi ch'uan practitioner seeks to neutralize the opponent's use of force before applying a countering force. In this give and take, this interplay of energies, T'ai chi ch'uan finds its highest expression as a form of self-defense.

 History of Guang Ping Yang Tai Chi 

The Guang Ping form is traced back to the great t'ai chi Master Yang Luchan (1799–1872), who had been adopted by the Chen family and had learned the Chen-style t'ai chi ch'uan from them. Yang Luchan  moved his family from the Chen village to the town of Guang Ping, and developed Yang-style tai chi chuan. The stances of this modified form were not as low as the Chen-style t'ai chi ch'uan form, with a combination of hard and soft styles, long and small circles and incorporated double jump kicks, and other wide sweeping kicks. The movements were long and deep, more energetic, with more apparent martial combat character. This Yang-style tai chi chuan became known as Guang Ping Yang Tai Chi Chuan. 
- the subject is lost in the second half of this para - is it Chen or Yang being described?

Yang Luchan taught his son, Yang Pan-hou, the Guang Ping Yang Tai Chi Chuan.Yang Pan-hou was reportedly the official teacher for the Imperial court of the Manchus. The indigenous Chinese, known as the Han, had been subjugated by the Manchus and therefore Yang Pan-hou did not want to pass down the family's true art to them. Also, the Manchurians were aristocrats and were not inclined to the more strenuous exercises, so Yang Pan-Hou adapted his father’s Guang Ping form to be more subtle and taught them a very elegant, middle-to-small frame form.  This is the Yang-style t'ai chi ch'uan style that has come to be known as the Beijing Yang-style. Yang Pan-hou secretly taught his father’s form (the Guang Ping style) only to select students who were not his family, who then taught it to only a few of their students and the art was subsequently lost to the Yang family.

Yang Pan-hou's lineage-holding disciple was Wang Jiao-Yu, a Han (native Chinese) and a stableman for the Imperial family. As the legend goes, one day Yang Pan-hou heard a noise over the fence and looked to see Wang Jiao-Yu practicing the Guang Ping form. He confronted Wang Jiao-Yu and demanded an explanation. Wang Jaio-Yu told him he had been secretly watching Yang Pan-hou practicing the Guang Ping form during the magic hours of 3:00 to 5:00 a.m. Yang Pan-hou told Wang Jiao-Yu that if he could put his chin to his toe in the chin-to-toe exercise within 100 days, he would teach Wang Jiao-Yu. And succeed Jiao-Yu did. Since Wang Jiao-Yu was a Han, Yang Pan-hou took Wang Jiao-yu as his student and trained him in the secret Guang Ping style, and made him promise not to teach this art as long as the dynasty was in power.

Wang Jiao-Yu kept this promise, and only began teaching the Guang Ping Yang Tai Chi Chuan much later in his life.

Kuo Lien Ying learned the form from Wang Jiao-Yu. Wang Jiao-Yu, purportedly 112 years of age at the time, accepted Kuo as one of very few disciples. From Wang's teaching, it is said that Kuo learned all the true skill and essence of Guang Ping Yang Tai Chi Chuan.

Kuo Lien Ying moved to San Francisco in the early 1960s and opened one of the first t'ai chi ch'uan studios in America with the help of Sifu David Chin. Sifu Chin first practiced with Kuo on the rooftop of the Sam Wong Hotel in Chinatown. Sifu Chin is the only living student of Kuo's to learn a second set of what he asserts Sifu Kuo called 'the Original Yang t'ai chi,' and that this 'Application Set' is crucial for the development of the boxing art that Kuo passed on. Sifu Chin taught the Application Set to Tim Smith (Raleigh, NC) in 1996. Prior to Kuo moving to America, he taught Kwok Wo Ngai the complete system as well. Kwok fled the communist revolution in China like Kuo and also came to America. He began teaching in New Jersey and was known as Peter Kwok.

 Guang Ping Yang Tai Chi Association 

The Guang Ping Yang Tai Chi Association was formed In 1997 to honor the memory of Sifu Kuo Lien Ying and in commemoration of his unselfish sharing of his many skills. The mission of the Association is to promote, perpetuate, develop interest in, and preserve the quality of Guang Ping Yang style Tai Chi Chuan throughout the world, and to provide support for research and education in Guang Ping Yang T'ai Chi Ch'uan.

Guang Ping Yang Tai Chi Association Honorary Chairmen:
Y.C. Chiang, Henry Look

Guang Ping Yang Tai Chi Association Past Presidents:
Henry Look, Donald Rubbo, Nina (Sugawara) Deerfield, Nick D’Antoni, Dominick Ruggieri, Randy Elia, Lawrence Riddle, Lucy Bartimole, Grace Cheng, Valarie Prince Gabel

Current President, Guang Ping Yang Tai Chi Association:
David Chosid

 Guang Ping Yang Tai Chi's Link to World Tai Chi Day 

In 1998, Guang Ping Yang Tai Chi teachers, Bill Douglas and his Hong Kong born wife Angela Wong Douglas, organized what CNN News dubbed the "largest gathering of its kind outside China" in Kansas City. 200 people gathered for a mass public exhibition of the Guang Ping Yang Style Tai Chi form. The iconic photo of that first World Tai Chi Day event was of 200 people joined in the final movement of the Guang Ping Yang Tai Chi form, Grand Terminus. That Guang Ping Yang Tai Chi image has appeared in newspapers worldwide, including in Russia's Omsk Daily Newspaper, and Hong Kong's South China Morning Post in articles about World Tai Chi Day. The global event, World Tai Chi Day, was co-founded by Guang Ping Yang Tai Chi students and teachers, Bill Douglas, and his wife, Angela Wong Douglas, who are 7 generations removed from Yang Style Tai Chi founder Yang Luchan, and 2 generations from Guang Ping Yang Tai Chi Master Kuo Lien Ying, studying under Jais Booth and Gil Messenger, who studied under Master Kuo and with Kuo's student Master Henry Look. Today, World Tai Chi Day is celebrated annually in hundreds of cities in over 70 nations, and has been officially proclaimed or recognized by government officials and body's worldwide, including Brazil's National Council of Deputy's, the Senates of California, New York, and Puerto Rico, and Governors of 22 U.S. States. It has been covered by China's Xinhua News Agency; Agency France Presse TV; Associated Press Television; BBC Television; CNN; FOX News; The New York Times; Wall Street Journal; USA Weekend; BBC Radio; The South China Morning Post, and media worldwide.

 Basic T'ai chi Principles 

The whole body is relaxed; do not use force. Relaxation does not mean slack, the body is full of potential yet empty. The term in Chinese for this is "sung".

Keep the mind focused; if the mind wanders, gently bring it back to its focus.

Be natural and at peace, release any tension.

The head should be as though it were suspended on a string from above, relaxed and lifted.

The body should not lean to any direction, and the spine should be lifted.

There must be a clear distinction between the empty (non-weighted) and full (weighted) feet (alternation of yin and yang).

Breathing must be long, even, and natural; do not hold or constrict the breath.

In even the slightest movement the whole body must move; do not let any part stop separately. When one part moves, all parts move; when one part stops, all parts stop.

 A Mnemonic of Thirteen T'ai chi ch'uan Movements 

From Kuo Lien Ying's book Tai-Chi Chuan in Theory and Practice''<ref>[https://www.amazon.com/dp/1556432984 Tai-Chi Chuan in Theory and Practice, Page 19-20] </ref>

BooksThe T'ai Chi Boxing Chronicle, Compiled and explained by Kuo Lien Ying, translated into English by Gordon Guttman  Tai-Chi Chuan in Theory and Practice'',  [https://www.amazon.com/dp/1556432984

References

External links 
Guang Ping Yang Tai Chi Association website

Tai chi styles
Neijia